Pennsylvania Route 504 (PA 504) is a  state highway located in Centre County in the U.S. state of Pennsylvania.  The western terminus is at PA 53/PA 350 in Philipsburg.  The eastern terminus is at US 220 Alternate/PA 144  in Wingate.

It roughly follows a portion of the path of the historic 1799 State Road from "Bald Eagle's Nest" (Milesburg) to Fort Le Boeuf (Waterford, PA), which was laid out and cleared under contract with the Pennsylvania Assembly and opened for travel by 1802. The State Road was an important thoroughfare during the War of 1812, and was for many years the primary route for mail, goods and travelers between Philadelphia and Erie. Many of the original, 19th-century stone mileposts are preserved along the northern side of the highway.

Route description

PA 504 begins at an intersection with PA 53 and PA 350 at the square in the center of the borough of Philipsburg, heading east-northeast on two-lane undivided East Presqueisle Street. West of the square, the road continues as a part of PA 53. The route passes through residential areas, passing woods to the south as it forms the border between Philipsburg to the north and Rush Township to the south. PA 504 fully enters Philipsburg again and passes more homes before coming to an intersection with US 322. Following this, the road heads into Rush Township and becomes unnamed, curving east through rural residential areas. The route passes through a mix of farmland and woodland prior to entering Moshannon State Forest. PA 504 continues into Black Moshannon State Park, where it passes over Black Moshannon Creek and runs through the community of Antes. The road leaves the state park and continues through more of the Moshannon State Forest.  

The route heads into Union Township and becomes Rattlesnake Pike, leaving the state forest and passing through more woodland with some agricultural clearings, making a few curves. PA 504 turns southeast and passes through more rural areas before crossing into the borough of Unionville and becoming Allegheny Street, passing homes and intersecting US 220 Alternate. At this point, PA 504 turns northeast to form a concurrency with US 220 Alternate on Union Street, running past more residences. The road leaves Unionville for Union Township, becoming South Eagle Valley Road and running through a mix of farmland and woodland with some homes. The two routes continue into Boggs Township and reach an intersection with PA 144 in the community of Wingate. Here, PA 504 ends and PA 144 turns northeast to join US 220 Alternate.

Major intersections

See also

References

External links

Pennsylvania Highways: PA 504

504
Transportation in Centre County, Pennsylvania